Pu Hong Ngai was the Chief Minister of Chin State, Myanmar from 2011 to 2016. Hong Ngai is a retired Brigadier General and former chairman of Chin State Peace and Development Council.

A member of the Union Solidarity and Development Party, he was elected to represent Mindat Township Constituency No. 2 as a Chin State Hluttaw representative in the 2010 Burmese general election.

References

Government ministers of Myanmar
Burmese military personnel
People from Chin State
Union Solidarity and Development Party politicians
Living people
Year of birth missing (living people)